The Vancouver Canucks are a professional ice hockey team based in Vancouver, British Columbia. The Canucks are a member of the Pacific Division in the Western Conference of the National Hockey League (NHL). The Canucks currently play home games at Rogers Arena. The Canucks joined the NHL in 1970 as an expansion team, along with the Buffalo Sabres. They have advanced to the Stanley Cup Finals three times but were defeated by the New York Islanders in 1982, the New York Rangers in 1994, and the Boston Bruins in 2011. The franchise has had eleven general managers since its inception.

Key

General managers

See also
List of current NHL general managers

Notes
 A running total of the number of general managers of the franchise. Thus any general manager who has two or more separate terms as general manager is only counted once.

References

Vancouver Canucks
 
Vancouver Canucks general managers
general managers